

Summary 
Finest City Improv is a privately held improvisational theatre in North Park, connected to the Lafayette Hotel.

Beginnings 

Finest City Improv started in September 2012 when the company joined the Ocean Beach Playhouse to offer Improv Classes. They then moved to the Lafayette Hotel and had their grand opening on December 6, 2013. They now host weekly shows, offer classes for adults, and bring improv comedy into business to teach team building.

San Diego Improv Festival 

Finest City Improv is the main sponsor and host of the San Diego Improv Festival. Starting in 2014, this annual event invites improvisers from around the world to showcase their talent in San Diego. Such guests include: The Boys, Opening Night, Red Door, and Robot Teammate and the Accidental Party.

Relax, We're All Just Making This Stuff Up! 
In 2016, owner and artistic director, Amy Lisewski wrote and published a book entitled "Relax, We're All Just Making This Stuff Up!" that applies the principles of improvisation as they can apply to individuals in the realm of self development and confidence building.

References 

Improvisational theatre
2012 establishments in California